Swet Shop Boys is a hip hop group, consisting of rappers Heems and Riz MC, with producer Redinho.

History
Originally formed by Heems and Riz MC, Swet Shop Boys released an EP, Swet Shop, in 2014. Along with Redinho, the group released the debut album, Cashmere, in 2016. In 2017, the group released an EP, Sufi La.

Discography
Albums
 Cashmere (2016), Customs

EPs
 Swet Shop (2014), Greedhead Music
 Sufi La (2017), Customs

References

External links
 Official website
 
 

Hip hop groups
Musical groups established in 2014